La révolution française may refer to:

 La Révolution française (film), 1989
 La Révolution Française, a 1973 rock opera
 French Revolution, a period in French history